Spit Island (also known as Kate Island) is an island of the Arctic Archipelago, in the territory of Nunavut. It lies in the Penny Strait, west of Devon Island.

Islands of the Queen Elizabeth Islands
Uninhabited islands of Qikiqtaaluk Region